Cesare Lovati (25 December 1891 – 22 July 1961) was an Argentinian-born Italian professional footballer, who played as a midfielder, and football manager. He represented the Italy national team at the 1920 Summer Olympics.

References

External links 
Profile at MagliaRossonera.it 
International caps at FIGC.it 

1891 births
1961 deaths
Italian footballers
Association football midfielders
Italy international footballers
A.C. Milan players
Italian football managers
Footballers at the 1920 Summer Olympics
Atalanta B.C. managers
A.C. Monza managers
U.S.D. 1913 Seregno Calcio managers